Richard Davol Chapman (March 23, 1911 – November 15, 1978) was an American amateur golfer. Time magazine crowned Chapman "the Ben Hogan of amateur golf".

Chapman was born in Greenwich, Connecticut. He was the 1940 U.S. Amateur golf champion. He was a member of Winged Foot Golf Club in Mamaroneck, New York, which was the site of his first major triumph. He remains one of only three players to have won a USGA title on their home course. He holds a place in the Masters Tournament record book for the most appearances (19) as an amateur, a distinction he shares with Charles Coe.

Although Chapman was quite the international player, winning the 1951 British Amateur, he also won state amateur championships in Connecticut, Massachusetts, New York and the Carolinas. He also won the prestigious North and South Amateur. At the 1958 U.S. Amateur, Chapman and his son, Dixie, both qualified, giving a rare father-and-son appearance.

Chapman's career was put on hold for World War II, where he served as a major in the U.S. Army Air Corps. After the war, Chapman picked up where he left off, with a string of victories in the British, French, Canadian, and Italian amateurs. Chapman is one of only two players (the other is Harvie Ward) who has won the U.S., British, and Canadian Amateur Championships.

"Blessed with a strong competitive spirit and an inquiring mind into the technicalities of the swing," reads the entry on Chapman in Who's Who in Golf. "Chapman not only played the game but wrote about it and worked at its many phases."

In the 1950s, Chapman collaborated with the USGA on a handicap format for foursomes play called the Chapman System, also known as Pinehurst or American Foursomes. The system worked as follows: two golfers on the same team each tee off, then play the other's ball. From there, they select the ball with which to complete the hole and continue as in foursomes.

Chapman played on the winning Walker Cup teams in 1947, 1951, and 1953.

Chapman's final success came in 1967 with a victory in the International Senior Amateur. A stroke in the early 1970s hampered his career, and he died in Rancho Santa Fe, California in 1978.

Chapman was inducted into the Connecticut Golf Hall of Fame in 2001.

Amateur wins (16)
this list is probably incomplete
1934 Westchester Amateur
1936 Connecticut Amateur
1938 Connecticut Amateur
1939 French Open Amateur, New York State Amateur
1940 U.S. Amateur
1948 Golf Illustrated Gold Vase
1949 Canadian Amateur
1950 Massachusetts Amateur
1951 British Amateur, New England Amateur
1952 French Open Amateur
1953 Carolinas Amateur
1957 Carolinas Amateur
1958 North and South Amateur
1960 Italian Open Amateur

Major championships

Amateur wins (2)

Results timeline

Note: Chapman never played in the PGA Championship.

M = Medalist
LA = Low Amateur
NT = No tournament
WD = withdrew
CUT = missed the half-way cut
R256, R128, R64, R32, R16, QF, SF = Round in which player lost in match play
"T" indicates a tie for a place

Source for The Masters: www.masters.com
Source for U.S. Open and U.S. Amateur: USGA Championship Database
Sources for British Amateur: The Glasgow Herald, May 24, 1935, pg. 22., The Glasgow Herald, May 26, 1936, pg. 20., The Glasgow Herald, May 29, 1937, pg. 21., The Glasgow Herald, May 27, 1939, pg. 3., The Glasgow Herald, May 28, 1948, pg. 6., The Glasgow Herald, May 30, 1952, pg. 2., www.opengolf.com
Source: Past Champions at Winged Foot Golf Club

U.S. national team appearances
Amateur
Walker Cup: 1947 (winners), 1951 (winners), 1953 (winners)

References

American male golfers
Amateur golfers
Golfers from Connecticut
United States Army Air Forces officers
Sportspeople from Greenwich, Connecticut
1911 births
1978 deaths